This is a list of films that involve Iran. (This listing excludes Iranian films).

List 

Iran